New Zealand competed at the 2015 World Aquatics Championships in Kazan, Russia from 24 July to 9 August 2015.

Medalists

Diving

New Zealand divers qualified for the individual spots and the synchronized teams at the World Championships.

Men

Women

Mixed

Open water swimming

New Zealand has qualified two swimmers to compete in the open water marathon.

Swimming

New Zealand swimmers have achieved qualifying standards in the following events (up to a maximum of 2 swimmers in each event at the A-standard entry time, and 1 at the B-standard):

Men

Women

Synchronized swimming

New Zealand fielded a full squad of ten synchronized swimmers to compete in each of the following events.

Water polo

Women's tournament

Team roster

Brooke Millar
Nicole Lewis
Sarah Pattison
Danielle Lewis
Simone Lewis
Sarah Landry
Miranda Chase
Caitlin Lopes Da Silva
Emma Stoneman
Liana Dance
Kirsten Hudson
Jasmine Myles
Katherine Curnow

Group play

13th–16th place semifinals

13th place game

References

External links
Swimming New Zealand

Nations at the 2015 World Aquatics Championships
2015 in New Zealand sport
New Zealand at the World Aquatics Championships